Jhudo railway station 
(Sindhi: جهڏو ريلوي اسٽيشن) is  located in Sindh Pakistan.

See also
 Jhuddo
 List of railway stations in Pakistan
 Pakistan Railways

References

External links

Railway stations in Mirpur Khas District